Franco Coria (born July 8, 1988 in Los Toldos) is an Argentine footballer who currently plays as a defender for Instituto ACC.

Club career
Coria joined Chacarita Juniors in 2007 and during the 2008 season was promoted to the first team. for the team's reserve side during the last four seasons. During the 
2008-09 season Coria made eight appearances in Argentina's Nacional B, as Chacarita won promotion to the Primera Division for the 2009-10 season. During the club's one-year stay in the top division Coria started five games and made three appearances as a substitute.

On February 17, 2011, the New England Revolution signed Coria.

References

External links
 Argentine Primera Statistics
 

1988 births
Living people
Argentine footballers
Argentine expatriate footballers
Chacarita Juniors footballers
New England Revolution players
Club Atlético Sarmiento footballers
Crucero del Norte footballers
Club Atlético Douglas Haig players
Club Blooming players
Club Cipolletti footballers
Instituto footballers
Primera Nacional players
Argentine Primera División players
Bolivian Primera División players
Torneo Federal A players
Expatriate soccer players in the United States
Expatriate footballers in Bolivia
Association football central defenders
Major League Soccer players
Sportspeople from Buenos Aires Province